The Mansion House is a house on Dawson Street, Dublin, which has been the official residence of the Lord Mayor of Dublin since 1715, and was also the meeting place of the Dáil Éireann from 1919 until 1922.

History
The Mansion House was built in 1710 by the merchant and property developer Joshua Dawson, after whom Dawson Street is named. It was constructed on a piece of poor quality marshy land outside the medieval city walls which was acquired by Dawson in 1705. 

Dublin Corporation purchased the house in 1715 for assignment as the official residence of the Lord Mayor. It retains this purpose to this day.

In 1821, the Round Room was built in order to receive King George IV., while the distinctive metal portico over the main door was erected for the visit of Queen Victoria in 1900.

The First Dáil assembled in the Round Room on 21 January 1919 to proclaim the Irish Declaration of Independence. Two years later, in 1921, the Anglo-Irish Treaty was ratified in the same location.

In the 1930s and 1940s, plans were made to demolish the building, and all other buildings on the block on which it is located (which covered an area on Dawson Street, Molesworth Street, Kildare Street and the north side of St. Stephen's Green), to enable the building of a new Dublin City Hall. However the decision of the Government to erect a new Department of Industry and Commerce on a site on the same block, on Kildare Street, led to the abandonment of the plans.

On 21 January 1969, a special fiftieth-anniversary joint session of Dáil Éireann and Seanad Éireann assembled in the Round Room and was addressed by the then President of Ireland, Éamon de Valera.

In August 2006, the loyalist paramilitary Ulster Volunteer Force claimed they had planted a bomb in the Mansion House in 1981, in an attempt to wipe out the Sinn Féin leadership at their party conference of that year. The claim led to a security alert at the house, as the Garda Siochana and army searched for a 25-year-old bomb, but none was found.

On 21 January 2019, the one-hundredth anniversary of the First Dáil, another special joint session of Dáil Éireann and Seanad Éireann was held in the Round Room and was again addressed by the Irish President. This time, the President was Michael D. Higgins.

Occupants
Its most famous occupants included Lord Mayors:
 Daniel O'Connell, nineteenth-century nationalist leader
 Alfie Byrne (1930s), longest serving Lord Mayor in the 800-year history of the office
 Jim Mitchell (1976–77), the youngest Lord Mayor of Dublin, aged 29, in the history of the office

References

External links
 Mayoral info website
  Mansion House Dublin Website

1710 architecture
1710 establishments in Ireland
Buildings and structures in Dublin (city)
Government buildings in the Republic of Ireland
Houses completed in 1710
Mayors' mansions
Official residences in the Republic of Ireland